The rufescent darkeye (Tephrozosterops stalkeri), also known as the bicoloured white-eye, is a species of bird in the family Zosteropidae. It is monotypic within the genus Tephrozosterops. It is endemic to the island of Seram in Indonesia. Its natural habitats are subtropical or tropical moist lowland forest and subtropical or tropical moist montane forest.

References

rufescent darkeye
Birds of Seram
Endemic fauna of Seram Island
rufescent darkeye
Taxonomy articles created by Polbot